Mount Airy High School is located on N South Street in Mount Airy, North Carolina. The front office is at the corner of N South Street and Orchard Street. The school first opened in 1895. Mount Airy's team name is the Granite Bears, and their school colors are navy blue and white.

Notable alumni 
 Daniel "Chipp" Bailey  former Sheriff of Mecklenburg County, North Carolina
 Bill Cox  NFL player
 Chubby Dean  MLB pitcher and first baseman
 Donna Fargo  country singer-songwriter
 Maddie Gardner  American news reporter and internationally recognized cheerleader
 Andy Griffith  actor and comedian; played the lead role of Andy Taylor in the sitcom The Andy Griffith Show
 Luke Lambert  crew chief in the NASCAR Cup Series
 Alex Sink  former Chief Financial Officer for the state of Florida and treasurer on the board of trustees of the Florida State Board of Administration
 Sarah Stevens  member of the North Carolina General Assembly
 Anna Wood  film, stage, and television actress

References

External links
 
 http://carolinapreps.com/teams/frontend/teampage/allTimeRecords/10/

Public high schools in North Carolina
Schools in Surry County, North Carolina